Joseph Albert Morello (July 17, 1928 – March 12, 2011) was an American jazz drummer best known for serving as the drummer for pianist Dave Brubeck, as part of the Dave Brubeck Quartet, from 1957 to 1972, including during the quartet's "classic lineup" from 1958 to 1968, which also included alto saxophonist Paul Desmond and bassist Eugene Wright. Morello's facility for playing unusual time signatures and rhythms enabled that group to record a series of albums that explored them. The most notable of these was the first in the series, the 1959 album Time Out, which contained the hit songs "Take Five" and "Blue Rondo à la Turk". In fact, "Take Five", the album's biggest hit (and the first jazz single to sell more than one million copies) was specifically written by Desmond as a way to showcase Morello's ability to play in  time.

Besides playing with Brubeck, Morello also served as an accompanist for other musicians, including Marian McPartland, Tal Farlow and Gary Burton, and recorded his own albums as well. He received numerous accolades during his life, including being named the best drummer by Down Beat magazine five years in a row.

Biography

He was born in Springfield, Massachusetts, United States to Joseph Morello and Lillian LaPalme. His father was a French emigrant from Nice and his mother hailed from French Canada. Morello suffered from partial vision from birth, and devoted himself to indoor activities. At six years old, he began studying the violin. Three years later, he was a featured soloist with the Boston Symphony Orchestra, playing Mendelssohn's Violin Concerto, and again three years later.

At the age of 15, Morello met the violinist Jascha Heifetz and decided that he would never be able to equal Heifetz's "sound".  Therefore, he switched to drumming, first studying with a show drummer named Joe Sefcik and then George Lawrence Stone, author of the noted drum textbook Stick Control for the Snare Drummer. Stone was so impressed with Morello's ideas that he incorporated them into his next book, Accents & Rebounds, which is dedicated to Morello. Later, Morello studied with Radio City Music Hall percussionist, Billy Gladstone.

After moving to New York City, Morello worked with numerous notable jazz musicians including Johnny Smith, Tal Farlow, Stan Kenton, Phil Woods, Sal Salvador, Marian McPartland, Jay McShann, Art Pepper, and Howard McGhee. After a period of playing in McPartland's trio, Morello declined invitations to join both Benny Goodman and Tommy Dorsey's bands, favoring a temporary two-month tour with the Dave Brubeck Quartet in 1955. Morello remained with Brubeck for well over a decade, departing in 1967. Morello later became an in-demand clinician, teacher and bandleader, whose former students include Danny Gottlieb, TigerBill Meligari, Bruce Springsteen E Street Band drummer Max Weinberg, Rich Galichon, Phish drummer Jon Fishman, Gary Feldman, Patrick Wante, Tony Woo, Frankie Valli and the Four Seasons drummer Gerry Polci, Jerry Granelli, RIOT drummer Sandy Slavin, retired Army Blues drummer Steve Fidyk, Glenn Johnson, Pittsburgh drummer Bennett Carlise, Level System author and professional drummer Jeff W. Johnson, Jazz drummer John B. Riley, and Bon Jovi drummer Tico Torres.

Morello appeared in many Brubeck performances and contributed to over 60 albums with Brubeck. On "Take Five", he plays an imaginative drum solo maintaining the 5/4 time signature throughout. Another example of soloing in odd time signatures can be heard on "Unsquare Dance", in which he solos using only sticks without drums in 7/4 time. At the end of the track, he can be heard laughing about the "trick" ending. He also features on "Blue Rondo à la Turk", "Strange Meadow Lark", "Pick-Up Sticks" and "Castilian Drums".

During his career, Morello appeared on over 120 albums. He authored several drum books, including Master Studies, published by Modern Drummer Publications, and also made instructional videos. Morello was the recipient of many awards, including Playboy magazine's best drummer award for seven years in a row, and Down Beat magazine's best drummer award five years in a row. He was elected to the Modern Drummer magazine Hall of Fame in 1988, the Percussive Arts Society Hall of Fame in 1993, and was the recipient of Hudson Music's first TIP (Teacher Integration Program) Lifetime Achievement award in June, 2010.

Morello died at his home in Irvington, New Jersey, on March 12, 2011, aged 82, and is interred at Saint Michael Cemetery. 

Upon his death, Morello's wife Jean gave control of Joe Morello's memorabilia and collections to Marvin Burock, one of Joe's students, who had toured extensively with Morello and who was tasked with transcribing Morello's Modern Drummer articles for ten years.

Discography

As leader/co-leader
 Collections (Intro, 1957) with Red Norvo, Art Pepper and Gerry Wiggins
 Joe Morello (RCA Bluebird, 1961-62) (Issued in 1989 - Partially reissues It's About Time)
 It's About Time (RCA, 1962)
 Another Step Forward (Ovation, 1969)
 Percussive Jazz (Ovation, 1977)
 Going Places (DMP, 1993)
 Morello Standard Time (DMP, 1994)

As sideman
With Dave Brubeck
 1957 Jazz Impressions of the U.S.A.
 1957 Dave Digs Disney
 1957 Reunion
 1958 Jazz Goes to Junior College
 1958 Jazz Impressions of Eurasia
 1958 Newport 1958
 1958 The Dave Brubeck Quartet in Europe
 1959 Gone with the Wind
 1959 The Riddle
 1959 Time Out
 1960 Brubeck and Rushing
 1960 Brubeck à la mode
 1961 Take Five Live
 1961 Time Further Out
 1961 Tonight Only!
 1962 Countdown—Time in Outer Space
 1962 Music from West Side Story
 1962 The Real Ambassadors
 1963 Bossa Nova U.S.A.
 1963 Brandenburg Gate: Revisited
 1963 Dave Brubeck Quartet in Amsterdam
 1961 Near-Myth
 1963 At Carnegie Hall
 1964 Dave Brubeck in Berlin
 1964 Jazz Impressions of Japan
 1964 Time Changes
 1965 Angel Eyes
 1965 Jazz Impressions of New York
 1965 The Canadian Concert of Dave Brubeck
 1966 My Favorite Things
 1966 Time In
 1966 Anything Goes: The Music of Cole Porter
 1967 Bravo! Brubeck!
 1967 Right Now!
 1967 The Last Time We Saw Paris
 1968 Jackpot!
 1971 Summit Sessions
 1972 Adventures in Time
 1973 On Campus
 1976 25th Anniversary Reunion
 1988 The Great Concerts: Amsterdam Copenhagen Carnegie Hall
 1991 Live (1956–1957)
 1992 Live (1954 and 1959)
 1993 Someday My Prince Will Come
 1993 St. Louis Blues

With Gary Burton
 1961 New Vibe Man in Town
 1962 Who Is Gary Burton?

With Tal Farlow
 1954 Tal Farlow Quartet
 1955 The Tal Farlow Album

With Marian McPartland
 1952 Lullaby of Birdland
 1955 Marian McPartland in Concert
1955 Live At the Hickory House
 1956 After Dark
 1957 The Marian McPartland Trio
 2002 Live at Shanghai Jazz
 2003 All My Life
With Gil Mellé
Gil Mellé Quintet/Sextet (Blue Note, 1953)
Gil Mellé Quintet with Urbie Green and Tal Farlow (Blue Note, 1953)
With Sal Salvador
 1956 Shades of Sal Salvador
Juicy Lucy (Bee Hive, 1978)
With Chuck Wayne
The Jazz Guitarist (Savoy, 1953 [1956])

With others
 1954 Jimmy Raney Quintet, Jimmy Raney
1956 The Middle Road, Jimmy McPartland
 1957 Dream of You, Helen Merrill
 1957 Mr. Roberts Plays Guitar, Howard Roberts
 1958 Sweet Paul Vol. 1 Paul Desmond
 1961 Jazz Winds from a New Direction, Hank Garland
 1977 Early Art, Art Pepper
 1979 The Big Apple Bash, Jay McShann
 1994 Burning for Buddy: A Tribute to the Music of Buddy Rich, Buddy Rich Big Band
 1994 The Gamut, Robert Hohner
 1995 Two Facets of Louis: 1920-1950, Louis Armstrong
 1997 Burning for Buddy: A Tribute to the Music of Buddy Rich Vol. 2, Buddy Rich Big Band
 2000 Chega de Saudade, Stan Getz
 2007 Sings the Ultimate American Songbook Vol. 1, Tony Bennett

Videography
Joe Morello – Drum Method 1: The Natural approach to Technique (DVD) Hot Licks 2006
Joe Morello – Drum Method 2: Around the Kit (DVD) Hot Licks 2006
Joe Morello, Danny Gottlieb: Natural Drumming Lessons 1&2 (DVD) Mel Bay Publications, Inc. 2005
Joe Morello, Danny Gottlieb: Natural Drumming Lessons 3&4 (DVD) Mel Bay Publications, Inc. 2006
Joe Morello, Danny Gottlieb: Natural Drumming Lessons 5&6 (DVD) Mel Bay Publications, Inc. 2006
The Art of Playing with Brushes (DVD) Hudson Music LLC 2007

Bibliography
 New Directions in Rhythm: Studies in 3/4 and 5/4 Time 1963
 Off the Record: A Collection of Famous Drum Solos 1966
 Rudimental Jazz: A Modern Application of Rudiments to the Drum Outfit 1967
 Master Studies: Exercises for the Development of Control and Technique Modern Drummer Publications, Inc. 1983
 Master Studies II: More Exercises for the Development of Control and Technique Modern Drummer Publications, Inc. 2006
 Rudimental Jazz: A Musical Application of Rudiments to the Drumset including CD, Modern Drummer Publications, Classics Series 2010

References

External links

 Joe Morello at Drummer Cafe
 
 Joe Morello Interview for the NAMM Oral History Program

 Rutgers Graduate Thesis on Joe Morello by his student Marvin Burock

1928 births
2011 deaths
People from Irvington, New Jersey
Musicians from New Jersey
Musicians from Springfield, Massachusetts
American jazz drummers
Jazz musicians from Massachusetts
Dave Brubeck Quartet members